Burmester Audiosysteme GmbH, commonly referred to as Burmester, is a German manufacturer of high-end audio components. The company is based in Berlin-Schöneberg and was founded in 1977 by an Austrian-born musician and engineer Dieter Burmester (1946–2015).

History 
Burmester Audiosysteme got its beginning in 1977. As a musician since his early days, Dieter Burmester always wanted to make his audio components and loudspeakers reproduce music as naturally and purely as possible.

It was the malfunction of a faulty preamplifier that caused the development of the first Burmester product. Because the products on the market couldn't satisfy Dieter Burmester's high demands, he built his own preamplifier, the Burmester 777 in July 1977 from parts of medical machines, which he produced in his own engineering office. The 777 is still the core element of Burmester's products and model of the type designation of the following components (composed of the year 77 and the month number 7).

Because the 777 was very successful, Burmester wanted to bring the first hi-fi power amplifier with symmetrical signal routing on the market. This was a novelty for the hi-fi world. However, in the beginning it was difficult to convince retailers and journalists.

By 1978, Burmester Audiosysteme GmbH was fully established. Already in 1978, the company introduced the characteristic chrome design, which has even found its way into the Museum of Modern Art in New York City.

In 1980, Burmester developed and produced the world's first modular preamplifier, the Burmester 808. Further milestones are the symmetrical switching technology, which was first used by Burmester in 1983, the first amplifier with DC coupling from the phono stage through to the speaker terminals and the first remote controlled speaker adjustment with relay circuit resistors, both introduced in 1987. In 1991, the company brought the first belt-driven CD player to the market.

In 1994/1995, Burmester enlarged its portfolio with loudspeakers and brought the first speaker system with a dual active/passive crossover network. Also in 1994, Burmester built a universal solution to clean the power supply. By now the manufacturer also offers in-wall loudspeakers and an all-in-one system.

Dieter Burmester was named ‘Entrepreneur of the Year’ in 2003 by the Berlin Association of Independent Business Owners. Burmester Audiosysteme is one of the founding members of the German Manufactories Initiative (Initiative Deutsche Manufakturen), the 'Handmade in Germany' foundation which represents German manufactories of handmade products and craftsmanship.

Dieter Burmester died in August 2015 at the age of 69, after a short but severe illness. After his death, the company was led by his widow Marianne Burmester. On 1 January 2017, Andreas Henke joined as co-CEO of Burmester Audiosysteme.

Products 
Burmester offers its products in three product lines and price points: Classic Line, Top Line, and Reference Line. As an extension to the traditional product lines, the Burmester Phase 3 is offered as an all-in-one home music system.

All Burmester products are developed in Berlin, manufactured by hand and distributed by dealers in around 50 countries on 5 continents. Most of the component parts are sourced from Germany.

Burmester Automotive 
In 2005, Burmester Automotive was founded to develop hi-fi sound systems for cars.

Bugatti 
Burmester started with a sound system for the Bugatti Veyron.

Porsche 
With the introduction of the Porsche Panamera sports vehicle in 2009, the Burmester Surround Sound System was introduced as an optional equipment. Within the following years the Burmester system could also be found on the option list for all other Porsche models.

Mercedes-Benz 
The cooperation with Mercedes-Benz also started in 2009. Together the companies developed two new audio systems, in particular for the S-Class model. In the following years more sound systems have been introduced for the C-Class, the V-Class and the E-Class. In line with the partnership, sound systems for the Mercedes-AMG GT and the Maybach S-Class have been developed as well.

Burmester's sound systems in the models of Porsche and Mercedes-Benz offer three different default settings: Pure, Smooth, and Live. The 3D-mode is only available in the Mercedes-Benz S-Class, the E-Class, the new W177 A-Class and the Porsche Panamera.

References

External links 
 

1977 establishments in Germany
Electronics companies established in 1977
Manufacturing companies based in Berlin
Audio equipment manufacturers of Germany
Audio amplifier manufacturers
Loudspeaker manufacturers
Consumer electronics brands
In-car entertainment